Leandro Semedo (born 24 December 1994 in Praia) is a Cape Verdean handball player for S.L. Benfica and the Cape Verde men's national handball team.

Career
He made his competitive national debut on January 15, 2021, in the 2021 World Men's Handball Championship against Hungary and lost 27–34.

References

1996 births
Living people
Sportspeople from Praia
Cape Verdean male handball players
FC Porto handball players
CB Ademar León players
S.L. Benfica handball players